The Great Synagogue is the main synagogue of the Jewish community in Copenhagen, Denmark. The synagogue is defined by its unique architecture around the Ark. During the first half of the 19th century, synagogues continued to be built in the classical tradition, but there began to be a revival of Greek and Roman architecture. The Great Synagogue in Copenhagen is one of a few synagogues of its period to use Egyptian elements in the columns, ceiling and cornice over the ark.

History

Arrival of Jews into Denmark 
Jews were first welcomed into Denmark in 1622 when they were invited into the country by Denmark's king. Although they were scattered around, many of the Jews settled in Copenhagen. Abraham Salomon became the first rabbi in the country in 1687. From 1766 until 1795, around 1,500 Jews worshipped in a small synagogue until it burned down. After the synagogue burned down, a division occurred between the orthodox and progressive members of the Jewish community. As a result, the building of a new synagogue was halted and many members resorted to worshipping in various homes. This division lasted for about 30 years until it was extinguished. The building of the Copenhagen Synagogue occurred after this. In 1814, Jews who were living in Denmark were given the same rights as other citizens as a result of the Royal Decree.

Architecture of the Copenhagen Synagogue 
Construction of the Copenhagen Synagogue was completed in 1833. It was designed by Danish architect Gustav Friedrich Hetsch. The synagogue was designed with the neoclassical style in mind, which is demonstrated through the building's simplistic design. The interior of the building, however, has designs that are from the Egyptian Revival style. This style works to help give the synagogue a more Eastern European feel rather than the traditional Northern European feel.

World War II

During World War II, the Torah scrolls of the synagogue were hidden at the Trinitatis Church and were returned to the synagogue after the war.

Terrorist attacks

1985

On 22 July 1985, the synagogue was struck by a bomb placed by Palestinian terrorists. While no people were injured in the attack on the synagogue, a second bomb placed by the same group destroyed the Copenhagen offices of the American Northwest Orient Airlines, killing one person and injuring 26. 4 individuals with links to Palestinian nationalist organizations, including Mohammed Abu Talb, were later convicted for these and several other terrorist attacks.

2015

A shooting occurred outside the synagogue on 15 February 2015, killing a Jewish community member, who had been providing security, and wounding two Danish Security and Intelligence Service police officers who were shot in the arms and legs. The shooting occurred a few hours after another shooting at a Denmark café. Swedish artist Lars Vilks is believed to be the main target of the café shooting. At the time of the shooting, a discussion was being held about cartoon portrayals of the Islamic prophet Muhammad. Vilks has received death threats in the past for his cartoon portrayals of the prophet.

See also
History of the Jews in Denmark

References

Further reading

Ashkenazi Jewish culture in Europe
Ashkenazi synagogues
Orthodox Judaism in Denmark
Orthodox synagogues
Synagogues completed in 1833
Synagogues in Denmark
Religious buildings and structures in Copenhagen
Listed religious buildings and structures in Denmark
20th-century attacks on synagogues and Jewish communal organizations
21st-century attacks on synagogues and Jewish communal organizations
Egyptian Revival synagogues
Judaism in Copenhagen